John Francis Meagher (July 5, 1894 –  December 7, 1968) was an American football player, coach of football, basketball, and baseball, and college athletics administrator.

Meagher played football for the University of Notre Dame in 1916, rising to a second-team end under then-assistant coach, Knute Rockne. He served with the United States Marines in France during World War I and played in four games with the Chicago Tigers in 1920, the first year of the National Football League (NFL).

Meagher embarked on a career in coaching in 1921 at St. Edward's University, where he served as head football coach from 1921 to 1928, compiling a record of 24–21–4, and as head basketball coach from 1921 to 1924. From 1929 to 1933, he coached football at Rice University, where he compiled a 26–26 record. From 1934 to 1942, he was the head football coach at Auburn University, where he compiled a 48–37–10 record. Shug Jordan was his assistant coach. During his nine seasons coaching the Auburn Tigers, they played in their first bowl game ever, the Bacardi Bowl. The game was held in Havana, Cuba. In 1935, Meagher was named the SEC Coach of the Year. He joined the Navy during World War II and served as a lieutenant commander in the United States Navy. Meagher also coached the Iowa Pre-Flight Seahawks football team in 1944 during World War II.  In 1946, he coached the first six games of the season for the Miami Seahawks of the All-America Football Conference (AAFC), going 1–5.

Former players of Meagher at Auburn University were known as Meagher's Marauders because of their aggression on the football field, and most of the games they played were on the road. During Meagher's first 6 years at Auburn, his players played only 3 home games. Meagher was the driving force behind the building of Auburn's stadium.  Auburn Stadium opened in 1939 and seated 7,500. Meagher's Marauders award a scholarship every year to an Auburn student during one of the fall games. In 2015, the Coach Jack Meagher Award (CJM) was awarded to Vincent "Bo" Jackson.

Meager died on December 7, 1968.  He is buried at Hollywood Memorial Gardens East in Hollywood, Florida.  Meagher was inducted into the St. Edward's University Athletics Hall of Fame in 1989.

Head coaching record

College football

References

External links
 

1890s births
1968 deaths
American football ends
Auburn Tigers athletic directors
Auburn Tigers football coaches
Chicago Tigers players
Iowa Pre-Flight Seahawks football coaches
Miami Seahawks coaches
Notre Dame Fighting Irish football players
Rice Owls football coaches
St. Edward's Hilltoppers baseball coaches
St. Edward's Crusaders football coaches
St. Edward's Hilltoppers men's basketball coaches
United States Marine Corps personnel of World War I
Sportspeople from Chicago
Coaches of American football from Illinois
Players of American football from Chicago
Basketball coaches from Illinois
Baseball coaches from Illinois